Huang Shuxian (born September 1954) is a Chinese politician, who previously served as the Minister of Civil Affairs of the People's Republic of China. He also served as Minister of Supervision, and Deputy Secretary of the Central Commission for Discipline Inspection.

Career 
Huang was born in Yangzhong, Jiangsu. He graduated from Nanjing University with a degree in philosophy. Huang spent his earlier career in his home province of Jiangsu, first as the party chief of Yangzhong County, then as the head of the Communist Youth League organization of Jiangsu province. In 1998, Huang became the deputy Discipline Inspection Secretary of Jiangsu province and the head of the province's department of Supervision. In February 2001, Huang was promoted to Vice Minister of Supervision of the People's Republic of China. He became a Standing Committee member of the CCDI at the 16th Party Congress in 2002, and a Deputy Secretary of the Commission at the 17th Party Congress in 2007.

Huang was a member of the 16th, 17th, and 18th Central Commissions for Discipline Inspection, and a member of the Standing Committee of the 18th CCDI. He has been a deputy CCDI secretary since 2007. He is also a member of the 18th Central Committee of the Communist Party of China. Huang was also the lead auditor of the Beijing Olympics. Huang became Minister of Supervision at the 2013 National People's Congress.

Huang met with the press on a somewhat regular basis to report on the work of the CCDI and the Ministry of Supervision. 

On November 7, 2016, Huang was appointed as Minister of Civil Affairs by Standing Committee of the National People's Congress, following a corruption scandal involving then-minister Li Liguo.

References 

1954 births
Nanjing University alumni
People's Republic of China politicians from Jiangsu
Chinese Communist Party politicians from Jiangsu
Living people
Politicians from Zhenjiang